The Upheaval of the Five Barbarians also translated as the Rebellion, the Revolt, or the Invasion of the Five Barbarians is a Chinese expression which refers to a series of rebellions and invasions between 304 and 316 by non-Han peoples, commonly called the Five Barbarians, living in North China against the Jin Empire, which had recently been weakened by a series of civil wars. The uprisings helped topple Emperor Huai of Jin in Luoyang and they ended the Western Jin dynasty in northern China. 

Rulers from four ethnic groups, the Xiongnu, Jie, Qiang and Di, then established a series of independent dynastic realms in northern China. The fifth group, the Xianbei in the north, were allied to the Western Jin and later Eastern Jin against the other four barbarians until turning on the Jin much later. A series of revolts in southern China occurred at the same time by refugees in Sichuan, Hubei and Hunan, resulting in the establishment of the Ba-Di Cheng Han state in Sichuan. This chaotic period of Chinese history, known as the Sixteen Kingdoms (五胡十六國, "Sixteen States of the Five Barbarians"), lasted over 130 years until the Northern Wei dynasty united northern China in the 5th century. The Eastern Jin dynasty survived in southern China until its eventual replacement by the Liu Song dynasty in 420.

Background

The southward migration of nomadic tribes into the lands around the Yellow River had been ongoing since the Eastern Han dynasty for several reasons. The Han dynasty's defeat of the Xiongnu confederation in the Han–Xiongnu War by Han General Dou Xian led to the Han dynasty deporting the Southern Xiongnu along with their Chanyu into northern China. In 167 AD, Duan Jiong conducted an anti-Qiang campaign and massacred Qiang populations as well as settled them outside the frontier in northern China.

The wars of the later Three Kingdoms period also encouraged this immigration, which repopulated previously devastated areas and provided military power and labour.

By the end of the 4th century, the nomadic tribes had moved into the Guanzhong area, as well as the watersheds of the Wei and Xing rivers, practically surrounding the Jin capital in Luoyang. At the same time, the accession of Emperor Hui of Jin, who was possibly developmentally disabled, led to a struggle between the princes of the ruling Sima family to control him, sparking off the War of the Eight Princes.

Revolts by the five barbarians took place before such as in Shanxi and Shaanxi. In 270, the Xianbei chieftain, Tufa Shujineng, started a decade long rebellion against Jin in Liang and Qin provinces. It coincided with Liu Meng's (劉猛) Xiongnu revolt in Bing province between 271 and 272. After Shujineng's defeat in 279, peace between Jin and the tribes would last until 294, when the Xiongnu, He San (郝散) revolted. In 296, his brother, He Duyuan (郝度元), aligned himself with the Qiang and Di people and also revolted. This revolt culminated in Qi Wannian's rebellion, which lasted between 296 and 299, and devasted Qin and Yong provinces.

Rise of Han Zhao 
The War of the Eight Princes lasted for more than a decade. Between 291 and 300, Empress Jia and her family controlled the Jin government. Corruption was rampant, and poor governance led to Qi Wannian's rebellion under her regime. After she was overthrown in 300, a series of civil wars between the Sima princes that lasted until 306 would severely weaken Jin's economy and military capacity. At the same time, the nomads were also being enlisted by the princes as military forces; one such force of Xianbei, under the command of Sima Yue, captured Chang'an in 306.

Taking advantage of this period of weakness, different tribal people, as well as the Han Chinese themselves, began to openly revolt. The Jie chief Shi Le was sold as a slave by Western Jin officials. After gaining his freedom, he followed his friend, the Han shepherd, Ji Sang and raised a rebel army under the guise of supporting and later avenging the Prince of Chengdu, Sima Ying. The Ba-Di chief Li Xiong captured Chengdu in 304, proclaiming the kingdom of Cheng Han. The most serious initial revolt, however, was Xiongnu chieftain Liu Yuan, who proclaimed the kingdom of Han Zhao in 304 as well, in the northern heartland of the Jin dynasty.

The over-reliance of the Jin princes on Xiongnu, Xianbei, and Wuhuan mercenaries exposed the weakness of the Jin dynasty to the nomadic tribes, the nomads also combined forces with internal peasant revolts in north China. Liu Yuan's, Han Chinese friend Wang Mi led such a peasant rebellion in Shandong, Hebei and Henan, and later joined forces with Han Zhao in 308. In 307, Ji Sang and Shi Le led a Han-nomad mixed revolt in Shandong and Henan. Although they sacked the city of Yecheng, they were eventually defeated that same year, resulting in Ji Sang's death and Shi Le joining Han Zhao.

A Sogdian merchant in China wrote a letter to another Sogdian referring to the Huns (Xiongnu) who had revolted as people who had previously been "property" of the Chinese Western Jin Emperor until their uprising against him and destruction of the capital at Luoyang. The Xiongnu rebel Liu Xuan, a relative of Xiongnu rebel chief Liu Yuan said his own Xiongnu people were treated as slaves by their Han Chinese rulers and now was the time to revolt against their Han Chinese rulers after the Jin exhausted themselves in the War of the Eight Princes, saying "The Jin dynasty people use us like slaves. Now they are killing each other's flesh and blood. It is God's abandonment of them and let us recover the Han".

Rise of Cheng Han 
The upheaval in southwest China arguably predates its northern counterpart. Qi Wannian's rebellion from 296 to 299 caused a mass influx of refugees moving into present-day southern Gansu and Sichuan. One Di leader, Yang Maosou, led his followers and refugees to Lüeyang, where he found the Chouchi state in 296. Li Te and his family, who were of Ba-Di ethnicity (called as such as their ancestors were from Ba before moving north and mingling with the Di people), decided to move back to their ancestral home in Yizhou to escape the rebellion.

In 300, Li Te and his brothers joined the Inspector of Yizhou, Zhao Xin, in his rebellion against Jin, but later betrayed him after he killed one of their brothers, Li Xiang. Li Te took the provincial capital, Chengdu and ousted Zhao Xin, but later submitted back to Jin due to the arrival of the new Inspector, Luo Shang. Still, Li Te retained a significant influence over the refugees in Yizhou. In 301, after months of Li Te and the refugees refusing to comply with an imperial edict ordering them to return north, Luo Shang declared war on them.

Li Te was killed in battle in 303, but in 304, his son, Li Xiong drove Luo Shang out of Chengdu and established the state of Cheng (renamed Han in 338). Li Xiong originally declared himself "King of Chengdu" before changing his title to "Emperor of Dacheng" in 306. Luo Shang fled to Ba Commandery (巴郡; present-day Chongqing), where he carried out raids on Cheng and attempted to contain it. In 309, Cheng faced its greatest challenge yet when Luo Shang launched an offensive to support rebelling Cheng administrators. Despite losing many key commanderies early on, Cheng was ultimately successful at recovering their territory and driving Jin out by 311, partly due to Luo Shang's death in 310 which prompted infighting among his generals.

During this period, Cheng was less active in expanding compared to Han Zhao. Their most significant gain came in 314, when rebels in Hanzhong submitted to Cheng. Apart from the wars in the north, major rebellions in Hubei and Hunan helped prevent Jin forces in the south from concentrating their resources to end the conflict in Sichuan. Between 303 and 304, a Man official, Zhang Chang led a revolt that spread across Jingzhou, Jiangzhou, Xuzhou, Yangzhou and Yuzhou, consisting of refugees and those evading a draft to fight in Yizhou. In 311, a Han official, Du Tao led a refugee uprising against Jin in Jingzhou and Xiangzhou (湘州; in modern Hunan) that lasted until 315. However, unlike the rebellion in Sichuan, the revolts in Hubei and Hunan were ultimately put down by Jin.

Disaster of Yongjia and Jin defeat

The Jin dynasty was ineffective in its attempts to halt the uprising. The Jin capital, Luoyang was open to Liu Yuan's son Liu Cong (who was now commander of the rebellious forces), and he attacked Luoyang twice in 309 and 310, without success. However, in the wake of the War of the Eight Princes, the Jin Chancellor, Sima Yue, was deeply suspicious of his subordinates and Emperor Huai of Jin. Yue feared that he would be overthrown, and combined with Han Zhao's attack on Luoyang, he left the capital with 40,000 troops to Xiang County (項縣; in present-day Shenqiu County, Henan) in 310, ostensibly to campaign against Shi Le.

The relationship between Sima Yue and Emperor Huai reached its breaking point after Emperor Huai conspired with Yue's powerful general, Gou Xi to campaign against him. Sima Yue discovered the conspiracy, but was so overwhelmed with stress that he became ill and later died. After Sima Yue's death, the main Jin forces in Henan, led by Wang Yan, decided to proceed to his peerage in Donghai to hold his funeral. However, Shi Le was able to track down the funeral procession. Shi Le ambushed and defeated Wang Yan at the Battle of Ningping, where more than 100,000 soldiers perished, including Wang Yan himself.

The defeat of Wang Yan's forces finally exhausted the military capacity of the Jin, leaving the capital Luoyang open to capture. Upon entering the city in 311 A.D., the invaders engaged in a massacre, razing the city and causing more than 30,000 deaths. This event in Chinese history was known as the Disaster of Yongjia, after the era name of Emperor Huai; the emperor himself was captured, while his crown prince and clansmen were killed. Gou Xi was also defeated and captured by Shi Le at Mengcheng County.

Despite the loss of the emperor and the capital, the Western Jin would continue for another five years. In 312, a group of Jin generals recaptured the important city of Chang’an, which had been lost to Han Zhao a year prior. They then acclaimed the 12-year-old Emperor Min of Jin (Emperor Huai’s nephew) as the new emperor. Elsewhere, Jin governors continued to resist Han Zhao. Most notable of these governors were Liu Kun in Bingzhou, Wang Jun in Youzhou, Sima Bao in Qinzhou and Zhang Gui in Liangzhou. Jin also received support from their Xianbei subjects, the Tuoba and Duan clan, and, while mostly remaining neutral, the Murong clan in Liaodong remained a vassal of Jin. However, the Jin leaders had conflicting goals and often did not trust each other. Han Zhao was able to exploit this weakness and defeat them one by one. In 316, Han Zhao forces reclaimed Chang'an and captured Emperor Min, thus ending the Western Jin dynasty.

Sixteen Kingdoms and Eastern Jin dynasty

The creation of Han Zhao and Cheng Han is often seen as the beginning of the Sixteen Kingdoms, a period of short-lived states in northern China (with the exception of Cheng Han) that lasted between 304 and 439. In 319, just three years after Chang’an fell, Shi Le, would break away from Han Zhao and form the Later Zhao. Meanwhile, as Jin gradually lost control over the north, the Zhang clan of Liangzhou and the Murong clan of Liaodong would gain full autonomy over their respective territory, leading to the creation of the Han-led Former Liang in 320 and the Xianbei-led Former Yan in 338. Other states that existed during this time but were not listed as part of the Sixteen Kingdoms were the Di-led Chouchi (established in 296) and Xianbei-led Dai (established in 310). As the period progresses, more and more of the Sixteen Kingdoms would form.

Han Zhao had Emperor Huai and Emperor Min killed in 313 and 318 respectively. Both emperors suffered similar fates; they were forced to serve as Liu Cong’s servants before being suspected of rebellion and executed. As the upheaval unfolded, the Prince of Langya, Sima Rui, emerged as an authoritative figure in southern China. Based in Jiankang, safe from the chaos in the north, many northern officials flocked to serve under Sima Rui, and following Emperor Min's capture, he became a popular candidate to ascend the throne. After Emperor Min's death in 318, Sima Rui declared himself emperor and found the Eastern Jin dynasty, formally shifting the Jin court to the south.

Historical impact

The collapse of the Western Jin had long-lasting effects. In the conquered areas, various non-Han leaders quickly established a large series of dynastic states, most of which were short lived; this era of fragmentation and state creation lasted for more than a century, until the Northern Wei regime finally conquered and "unified" the northern regions in 439 and became the first of the Northern Dynasties.

The chaos and devastation of the north also led to a mass migration of Han Chinese to the areas south of the Huai River, where conditions were relatively stable. The southward migration of the Jin nobility is referred to in Chinese as yī guān nán dù (lit. "garments and headdresses moving south"). Many of those who fled south were of prominent families, who had the means to escape; among these prominent northern families were the Xie clan and the Wang clan, whose prominent members included Xie An and Wang Dao. Wang Dao, in particular, was instrumental in supporting Sima Rui to proclaim the Eastern Jin dynasty at Jiankang and serving as his chancellor. The Eastern Jin, dependent on established southern nobility as well as exiled northern nobility for its survival, became a relatively weak dynasty dominated by regional nobles who served as governors; nonetheless it would survive for another century as a southern regime.

While the era was one of military catastrophe, it was also one of deep cultural interaction. The nomadic tribes introduced new methods of government, while also encouraging introduced faiths such as Buddhism. Meanwhile, the southward exodus of the cultured Jin elite, who then spread across the southern provinces including modern-day Fujian and Guangdong, further integrated the areas south of the Yangtze River into the Chinese cultural sphere.

Han Chinese migrations 
The "Eight Great Surnames" were eight noble families who migrated from northern China to Fujian in southern China due to the uprising of the five barbarians when the Eastern Jin was founded, the Hu, He, Qiu, Dan, Zheng, Huang, Chen and Lin surnames.

The different waves of migration such as the fourth century and Tang dynasty northern Han Chinese migrants to the south are claimed as the origin of various Chen families in Fuzhou, Fujian.
Mass migrations led to southern China's population growth, economic, agricultural and cultural development as it stayed peaceful unlike the north. Yellow registers were used to record the original southern Han Chinese population before the migration and white registers were used to record the massive influx of commoner and aristocratic northern Han Chinese migrants by the Eastern Jin dynasty government.

After the establishment of the Northern Wei in northern China and a return to stability, a small reverse migration of southern defectors to northern China took place. In Luoyang a Wu quarter was set up for southerners moving north. Han Chinese male nobles and royals of the southern dynasties who fled north to defect married over half of Northern Wei Xianbei Tuoba princesses. Southern Chinese from the southern capital of Jiankang (Nanjing) were deported to the northern capital of Chang'an by the Sui dynasty after reuniting China.

Han Chinese refugees from the five barbarian uprising also migrated into the Korean peninsula and into the Murong Former Yan state. Eastern Jin maintained nominal suzerainty over the Murong state until 353 as the Murong accepted titles from them. An official in the Murong state, Dong Shou defected to Goguryeo. Han Chinese refugees migrated west into Han Chinese controlled Former Liang.

The descendants of northern Han Chinese aristocrats who fled the five barbarians uprising to move south with the Eastern Jin and the local southern Han Chinese aristocrats already in southern China combined to form the Chinese Southern aristocracy in the Tang dynasty, in competition with the northeastern aristocracy and the mixed Han-Xianbei northwestern aristocracy of the former Northern Zhou who founded the Sui dynasty and Tang dynasty. The southern aristocracy only intermarried with each other and viewed themselves as preserving Han culture.

Southern Chinese Daoism developed as a result of a merger of the religious beliefs of the local southern Han Chinese aristocrats and northern Han Chinese emigres fleeing the five barbarians. The Han aristocrats of both south and north were highly insular and closed against outsiders and descended from the same families who originally hailed from northern China.

Ming dynasty writer and historian Zhu Guozhen (1558-1632) remarked on how the Ming dynasty managed to successfully control Mongols who surrendered to the Ming and were relocated and deported into China to serve in military matters unlike the Eastern Han dynasty and Western Jin dynasty whose unsuccessfully management of the surrendered and defeated barbarians they imported into northern China who learned to study history and this led to rebellion : Late during the Eastern Han (25-220 C.E.), surrendering barbarians were settled in the hinterlands [of China]. In time, they learned to study and grew conversant with [matters of the] past and present. As a result, during the Jin dynasty (265-419), there occurred the Revolt of the Five Barbarian [Tribes](late in the third and early in the fourth centuries C.E.).184 During our dynasty, surrendering barbarians were relocated to the hinterlands in great numbers. Because [the court] was generous in its stipends and awards, [the Mongols are content to] merely amuse themselves with archery and hunting. The brave185 among them gain recognition through [service in] the military. [They] serve as assistant regional commanders and regional vice commanders. Although they do not hold the seals of command, they may serve as senior officers. Some among those who receive investiture in the nobility of merit may occasionally hold the seals of command. However [because the court] places heavy emphasis on maintaining centralized control of the armies, [the Mongols] do not dare commit misdeeds. As a consequence, during the Tumu Incident, while there was unrest everywhere, it still did not amount to a major revolt. Additionally, [the Mongols] were relocated to Guangdong and Guangxi on military campaign. Thus, for more than 200 years, we have had peace throughout the realm. The dynastic forefathers' policies are the product of successive generations of guarding against the unexpected. [Our policies] are more thorough than those of the Han. The foundations of merit surpass the Sima family (founders of the Eastern Jin) ten thousand fold. In a word, one cannot generalize [about the policies towards surrendering barbarians].186

References

Sources

Li, Bo; Zheng Yin (Chinese) (2001) 5000 years of Chinese history, Inner Mongolian People's publishing corp,

300s conflicts
310s conflicts
4th-century rebellions
Invasions
Rebellions in the Jin dynasty (266–420)
Wars involving Imperial China
Five Barbarians